Ali Baal Masdar is an Indonesian politician. He is the formerly governor of West Sulawesi province from 2017 to 2022, and the regent of Polewali Mandar Regency.

Masdar's election experienced several problems. Thousands of ballots were damaged in the weeks before the election, which required them to be reprinted; weather conditions raised fears about the polls being inaccessible; and constituencies living in mountainous areas posed transportation problems for ballot delivery. Due to fears of civil unrest during the public counting of ballots, the province dispatched several hundred police officers to the polls, though quick counts had already demonstrated Masdar's victory by then.

References

Governors of West Sulawesi
Indonesian Muslims
Living people
People from West Sulawesi
1960 births